Granåsen Ski Centre (in Norwegian: Granåsen skisenter) is a winter sport venue located in Trondheim, Norway. Granåsen Ski Centre frequently hosts competitions arranged by FIS; Ski jumping World Cup and Continental Cup, Nordic combined World Cup and has hosted events in the Cross-Country World Cup on five occasions and Biathlon World Cup on one occasion. The FIS Nordic World Ski Championships 1997 took place at Granåsen.

Biathlon
A shooting range for biathlon was built in 2008 and 2009 and was used during Biathlon World Cup competitions in March 2009.

Cross-country skiing
Granåsen Ski Centre has hosted events in the Cross-Country World Cup on five occasions; 1989–90, 1995–96, 1996–97, 1999–2000 and latest in the 2008–09 season. In 2020, the two last stages of the FIS Ski Tour 2020 were held at Granåsen.

Ski jumping

The ski jumping hill sports one K-90 hill and one K-124 hill.

Before the 2008–2009 season the large hill was improved, and the K-spot is now located at 124 meters while the hill size has been increased to 140 meters. The hill record belongs to Kamil Stoch, who jumped 146 m in March 2018 during the World Cup competition.

Summer Use
The centre includes a  roller ski course. Some of the ski jumping hills are also used during summer.

The Cross-Country and Biathlon arenas hosts outdoor concerts during the summer. Major artists that have performed there includes Bruce Springsteen, Robbie Williams and Metallica.

Notable events

References

Sports venues in Trondheim
Ski stadiums in Norway